Opuntia tuna is a species of cactus in the genus Opuntia. It is endemic to Hispaniola (in the Dominican Republic), Jamaica and other Caribbean Islands. The first description was in 1753 by Carl Linnaeus as Cactus tuna. Philip Miller described it as Opuntia tuna in 1768. It has one taxonomic synonym.

References

Plants described in 1753
Taxa named by Carl Linnaeus
tuna
Taxa named by Philip Miller
Flora of the Dominican Republic
Flora without expected TNC conservation status